"Definite Door" is a song by the American alternative rock band The Posies, released as the final single released from its album Frosting on the Beater in 1994.

It was the only Posies release to make the UK Singles Chart, entering at number 67 for one week. The single was supported by an appearance on The Word, a late night television programme in the UK.

Track listing

"Definite Door"
"Song of the Baker"
"Ooh Child"
"I Am the Cosmos" (Chris Bell)

References

1994 singles
Songs written by Ken Stringfellow
Songs written by Jon Auer
1993 songs
DGC Records singles